Mundaria is a genus of beetles in the family Buprestidae, containing the following species:

 Mundaria analis (Saunders, 1867)
 Mundaria brooksi (Kerremans, 1912)
 Mundaria dessumi Descarpentries & Villiers, 1966
 Mundaria harmandi (Thery, 1941)
 Mundaria postfasciata Obenberger, 1922
 Mundaria typica Kerremans, 1894

References

Buprestidae genera